The Philadelphia Canoe Club (PCC) is one of oldest paddling organizations in the United States. Headquartered in an 18th-century mill at the confluence of the Wissahickon Creek and Schuylkill River in the Manayunk section of Philadelphia, PCC counts among its members more than 200 canoeists and kayakers who take scores of trips every year on local rivers and streams as well as numerous waterways throughout North America.

Chartered in 1905, Philadelphia Canoe Club is the third oldest paddling club in the United States. It began as a men's social club situated on the picturesque banks of the Schuylkill River. Early members engaged in all forms of boating including canoeing and powerboating. Canoe racing was popular in the early days of the club and a number of members raced on an international level, including Russ McNutt, who competed in the 1936 Olympics held in Berlin. Other members competed in the Olympic Games in 1952, 1956 and 1972.

PCC, an affiliate of the American Canoe Association (ACA), is an active teaching club, training new paddlers with a schedule of courses in flat-water and whitewater canoeing, whitewater kayaking and sea-kayaking. Additionally, the club offers training courses in river safety and swift-water rescue. Each year more than 300 people are introduced to paddling through PCC training courses. The ACA presented Philadelphia Canoe Club with its prestigious Stroke of Achievement Award for superior performance and program development in 2000 and 2005.

The mill serving as the venerable home of PCC is a stone structure that was in commercial operation for many decades. Located on Fairmount Park property, the building, formerly known as Colony Castle, houses many examples of hand-crafted wooden canoes and kayaks built by members over the years. On display is a restored 34-foot 1911 Old Town War Canoe, which is taken out a few times a year and paddled on the Schuylkill River.

Philadelphia Canoe Club members lead trips on a diverse selection of rivers throughout the region and continent. On any given weekend during the paddling season there may be as many as a half-dozen trips scheduled on both flat-water and whitewater destinations. Local rivers and streams paddled include the Schuylkill, Delaware, Lehigh, Tohickon, Nescopeck, Batsto, Mullica, Wading, Oswego, Maurice, Toms, Great Egg Harbor, Cedar Creek, Brandywine Creek, and Westecunk Creek. Other popular destinations include the Hudson, Potomac, New, Gauley, Ottawa, Black, Salmon, Youghiogheny, Cheat, Tygart, Big Sandy, and Deerfield. Canoe camping trips include excursions on the Upper Delaware, the many rivers of the Adirondacks, the rivers and lakes of Algonquin Provincial Park in Ontario, the rivers of the New Jersey pine barrens and Florida Keys.

The club publishes a monthly newsletter, the CaNews, which highlights events and people. A public website featuring trip schedules is available at  philacanoe.org.

References

External links

PCC on YouTube  https://www.youtube.com/user/leflas#p/u/6/ue1liSp-C-w

Canoe clubs in the United States
Sports in Philadelphia
1905 establishments in Pennsylvania
Clubs and societies in Philadelphia